Stephen, Steven, or Steve Shapiro could refer to: 

Stephen A. Shapiro, American psychotherapist
Steve Shapiro (born 1963), American vibraphonist and music producer
Steven A. Shapiro, American army general officer
Steven R. Shapiro (born 1951), American attorney and former National Legal Director of the American Civil Liberties Union

See also
Steve Schapiro (born 1934), American photographer